NewGenLib is an integrated library management system developed by Verus Solutions Pvt Ltd. Domain expertise is provided by Kesavan Institute of Information and Knowledge Management in Hyderabad,  India. NewGenLib version 1.0 was released in March 2005. On 9 January 2008, NewGenLib was declared free and open-source under GNU GPL. The latest version of NewGenLib is 3.1.1 released on 16 April 2015. Many libraries across the globe (mainly from the developing countries) are using NewGenLib as their Primary integrated library management system as seen from the NewGenlib discussion forum.

Modules & Functions
NewGenLib has following main modules:
Acquisitions
Technical Processing
Serials management
Circulation
Administration
MIS Reports
Task to do today (daily scheduler)
OPAC

Some advanced functional features:

 Android mobile and tablet capable  
 Integration with Twitter helping send messages of transactions directly to users’ Twitter accounts.  
 Flexibility of defining own search field in OPAC.  
 Enhanced contents and interactive OPAC like Availability of Book jackets, Google preview, Comments/ Book review, Tagging, Favorite reading list, etc.
 Zotero compliant OPAC
 RSS Feeds in OPAC
 Faceted Browsing (Refining search results)
 Suggestion for other books in the rack 
 RFID supports
 Provision for frequently used predefined templates along with freedom of defining own customized data entry template s in Cataloguing
 Configurable SMS system - a proof of transaction.
 Integration with Gmail or paid mailbox account. This enables automatic sending of email to patrons during issue /return.
 Enhanced Report Module for generating in .csv format with a provision for wide customization.
 Provision for integrating with Vufind SOPAC (Ex: OPAC of the Library of Bangalore University).
 Catalogue can be harvested through Google site map, and thus the visibility of the library can be further improved.

Technologies Used & Standards Supported  
NewGenLib uses a number of well supported and widely used, reliable and well tested open source components like
PostgreSQL, Apache Tomcat, and Solr Lucene. It is entirely Java-based, platform-neutral, and uses the following major software technologies in its presentation, web server and database layers.

 Java SE
 Apache Tomcat server
 Spring framework
 Hibernate framework
 Lucene and Solr
 JDOM for XML messaging
 Java Servlets, JavaServer Pages
 Java Mail
 OpenOffice.org for form letters
 JasperReports
 FreeMarker template (from version 3.04 R1)

NewGenLib is platform independent and can be installed on Linux and Windows operating systems.

Standards supported by NewGenLib

 MARC21 – For bibliographic data 
   − Import and Export in ISO 2709, MARC XML
 MARC21 – For authority files
   − Import available in ISO 2709
 MARC21 – Holdings
   − Holdings data structures designed for MARC21 Holdings.
 Z39.76 – Holdings statement display
 MODS 3.0, AGRIS AP
  − Bibliographic records can be exported in MODS 3.0 and AGRIS AP
 ISBD
  − Record display and punctuations as per ISBD rules.
 OAI-PMH
  − Allows harvesting (manual) from external repositories
   − Create Open archive collections, and items, search the repositories and also act as data provider
  − Metadata formats: MARC XML, DUBLIN CORE, MODS 3.0 and AGRIS
 SRU/W
  − Federated search engines can search bibliographic databases using this protocol
  − Query language: CQL (Common Query Language), bench marking Level 1 compliance
  − Profiles used: BATH, and DUBLIN CORE
  − Metadata standards: MARC XML and MODS 3.0
 Unicode 4.0
 Z39.50 Client for federated searching

It is also Zotero Compliant.

Types of libraries
NewGenLib can be used for any type of library. Presently, it is used by  Libraries  of following types. 
 University libraries
 College/School libraries
 Public libraries
 Libraries in Research Institutes
 Church libraries
 Libraries in Offices/Corporates

See also 

 List of free and open source software packages

References

External links
Official website, as an open-source project.

Library cataloging and classification
Free software programmed in Java (programming language)
Free library and information science software